The name Liza has been used for four tropical cyclones in the Eastern Pacific Ocean.

 Tropical Storm Liza (1961) – A minimal storm that did not affect land.
 Hurricane Liza (1968) – didn't hit Mexico, but caused damage out to sea.
 Tropical Storm Liza (1972) – A weak tropical storm that didn't affect land.  
 Hurricane Liza (1976) – A Category 4 hurricane that killed more than 1,000 people in northern Mexico.

Use of the name was discontinued when new storm name lists were created in 1978.

See also 
 Tropical Storm Lisa, a similar name also used.

Pacific hurricane set index articles